Heather Danielle Petri (born June 13, 1978) is an American water polo player, who won the silver medal with the US women's national team at the 2000 Summer Olympics, a bronze medal at the 2004 Summer Olympics, a silver medal in Beijing in 2008 and the gold medal in London 2012. She is one of four female players who competed in water polo at four Olympics; and one of two female athletes who won four Olympic medals in water polo. Her position is attacker.

Petri began playing water polo on the boys' team in high school, but helped begin a girls' water polo program at Miramonte High School and was team captain for two years. In 1997 she was recruited by UC Berkeley coach Maureen O'Toole, and played collegiate water polo from 1997–2001. Petri earned All-America and All-MPSF honors at Cal in 1998 and 1999 and finished her college career with 96 goals. She sat out her senior season as a member of the first US women's Olympic water polo team, and graduated from Berkeley in 2002 with a degree in integrative biology. She played for Rari-Nantes, a professional water polo team in Florence, Italy, for the 2004–2005 and 2005–2006 season, and is currently a member of the US senior women's team.

In March 2007, Petri competed in the 2007 World Aquatics Championships, representing the United States. After a series of victories, the United States won the gold medal, becoming world champions. Petri also won a gold medal in the 2003 World Aquatic Championships in Barcelona, Spain and in 2009 in Rome. She is now a three time World Champion.

At the 2008 China Summer Olympic games, she and the American team lost 8-9 in the Championship game to the Netherlands and took home the silver medal.

Career
In June 2009, Petri was named to the USA water polo women's senior national team for the 2009 FINA World Championships.  She currently works as an assistant coach for the Cal Women's water polo team under former olympic teammate Coralie Simmons.

Awards 
In 2018, she was inducted into the USA Water Polo Hall of Fame.

See also
 United States women's Olympic water polo team records and statistics
 List of multiple Olympic medalists in one event
 List of Olympic champions in women's water polo
 List of Olympic medalists in water polo (women)
 List of players who have appeared in multiple women's Olympic water polo tournaments
 List of world champions in women's water polo
 List of World Aquatics Championships medalists in water polo

References

External links
 

1978 births
Living people
Sportspeople from Oakland, California
American people of Austrian descent
American female water polo players
Water polo drivers
Water polo players at the 2000 Summer Olympics
Water polo players at the 2004 Summer Olympics
Water polo players at the 2008 Summer Olympics
Water polo players at the 2012 Summer Olympics
Medalists at the 2000 Summer Olympics
Medalists at the 2004 Summer Olympics
Medalists at the 2008 Summer Olympics
Medalists at the 2012 Summer Olympics
Olympic gold medalists for the United States in water polo
Olympic silver medalists for the United States in water polo
Olympic bronze medalists for the United States in water polo
World Aquatics Championships medalists in water polo
Water polo players at the 2011 Pan American Games
Pan American Games medalists in water polo
Pan American Games gold medalists for the United States
California Golden Bears women's water polo players
American water polo coaches
Miramonte High School alumni
Medalists at the 2011 Pan American Games